Miss Thailand, is a beauty pageant held in Thailand for Thai women, first held on December 10, 1934, in Phra Nakhon District of Bangkok, under the name of Miss Siam. Since 2023, the winner of the pageant represents Thailand at Miss World.

The winner of Miss Thailand used to represent the country at Miss Universe, while 1st Runner-up presented at Miss Asia Pacific International. However, Miss Thailand Organization lost these licenses to Miss Thailand Universe in 2000. The last Miss Thailand to represent her country at Miss Universe 1999 is Apisamai Srirangsan, Miss Thailand 1999.

In 2019, Sireethorn Leearamwat, Miss Thailand 2019, represented the country at Miss International 2019 and won the title for the first time for Thailand.

The reigning Miss Thailand 2023 is Chonnikarn Supittayaporn from Chiang Mai.

Broadcast
The beauty pageant was broadcast on BBTV (channel 7) until 2000, then moved to ITV, which later was transformed into TITV (Thailand Independent Television) and TPBS (Thailand Public Broadcasting Service) until 2007.

In 2008–2014, Miss Thailand pageant was broadcast on MCOT.

In 2016 and 2020–present, Miss Thailand pageant was returned to broadcast on BBTV (channel 7).

In 2019, Miss Thailand pageant was returned to broadcast on MCOT.

International Crowns 

The following are the Miss Thailand titleholders throughout the years.

Winner of international beauty pageants:

 Two — Miss Universe crowns (1965 • 1988)
 Apasra Hongsakula (1965) • Porntip Nakhirunkanok (1988)
 One — Miss International crown (2019)
Sireethorn Leearamwat (2019)
Winner at Minor international pageant :
Two — Miss Asia Pacific crowns (1988 • 1997)
 Preeyanuch Panpradub (1988) • Worarat Suwannarat (1997)

Titles 
Note that the year designates the time Miss Thailand has acquired that particular pageant franchise.

Titleholders

Winners by province

Miss Thailand representatives at International beauty pageants

Miss World

Miss Charm

Past Franchises

Miss Universe

 Miss Thailand Organization sent a winner representative to compete at Miss Universe.

* In 1954 Amara Asavananda, 2nd runner-up in Miss Thailand 1953, was selected to compete in Miss Universe 1954, becoming her country's first representative at the Miss Universe pageant.
** In 1959 the Miss Thailand pageant was not held; Sodsai Vanijvadhana was hand-picked to represent Thailand in the Miss Universe 1959 pageant.
*** Due to the political crisis in 1973, the Miss Thailand pageant was not held; The national director in that time hand-picked Benjamas Ponpasvijan to represent Thailand in 1974 and later held the small pageant called Miss Thailand Universe (not to be confused with Miss Universe Thailand pageant which was started to be held in 2000) from 1975 to 1983 when the Miss Universe license returned to the Miss Thailand pageant organizers.
**** In 1996 Miss Thailand wasn't held; Niratchla Khamya, Top 10 in Miss Thailand 1995 was selected to represent Thailand in the Miss Universe pageant.

Miss International

Miss Tourism Queen International

Miss Asia Pacific

Miss Queen of the Pacific

Miss Flower Queen

Miss Wonderland

World Miss University

See also

References

External links 

Thailand
Recurring events established in 1934
1934 establishments in Siam